Ildefonsia is a monotypic genus of flowering plants belonging to the family Plantaginaceae. The only species is Ildefonsia bibracteata.

It is native to Brazil.

The genus name of Ildefonsia is in honour of Antonio Ildefonso Gomes de Freitas (1794–1859), a Brazilian botanist and doctor in Rio de Janeiro. The Latin specific epithet of bibracteata refers to 'bi' meaning 2 and 'bracteate' meaning possessing bracts which is a modified leaf associated with a flower or inflorescence.
Both genus and species were first described and published by George Gardner in 1842.

References

Plantaginaceae
Plantaginaceae genera
Monotypic Lamiales genera
Plants described in 1842
Flora of Brazil